The 1904 Ole Miss Rebels football team represented the University of Mississippi during the 1904 Southern Intercollegiate Athletic Association football season. The season was up-and-down, featuring a 69–0 loss to SIAA champion Vanderbilt and 114–0 defeat of Southwestern Baptist.

Schedule

References

Ole Miss
Ole Miss Rebels football seasons
Ole Miss Rebels football